CFAK-FM is a Canadian radio station, broadcasting at 88.3 FM in Sherbrooke, Quebec. It is the campus radio station of the Université de Sherbrooke.

Owned by Comité de la radio étudiante universitaire de Sherbrooke (CREUS), the station received CRTC approval on March 7, 2003.

References

External links
 CFAK-FM
 
 

Fak
Fak
Université de Sherbrooke
Fak
Radio stations established in 2003
2003 establishments in Quebec